The Limay River is an important river in the northwestern Argentine Patagonia (the region of Comahue). It then meets the Neuquén River and together they become the Río Negro. At this confluence lies the city of Neuquén.

The river serves as natural border between the provinces of Río Negro and Neuquén. Its deep waters are clear, and carry a large flow,  on average.

The waters of the Limay are used to generate hydroelectricity at the five dams built on its course: Alicurá, Piedra del Águila, Pichi Picún Leufú, El Chocón, and Arroyito; together with the Cerros Colorados Complex on the Neuquén River they constitute more than one quarter of Argentina's total hydroelectric power generation. In the 1980s the only heavy water plant in South America was constructed next to the river at the town of Arroyito.

The river is also used for fly fishing; in some locations its banks are suitable as beach resorts, with facilities for camping.

The origin of the word comes from the Mapuche indians and it means, crystalline, that you could see to the bottom.

Gallery

References 
 Colbert E. Cushing, Kenneth W. Cummins, G. Wayne Minshall: River and Stream Ecosystems of the World: With a New Introduction. University of California Press 2006, S. 280ff (eingeschränkte Online-Version (Google Books))
 Argentour — Río Limay
 Pescando con Mosca en la Patagonia Argentina
 Ministry of Environment — Hydrological basins of Argentina.
 Ministry of Economy — Provincial Economic Overview, Neuquén, August 2005.

Rivers of Río Negro Province
Rivers of Neuquén Province
Rivers of Argentina